Sonoma Valley Airport  is a public-use airstrip founded in 1946 by Wally Reichelt in Sonoma, California, United States. Its first California-certificated runway opened in August 1959.

Open to public use for light aircraft, Sonoma Valley Airport does not allow ultralight and rotorcraft operations, except for MEDEVAC or law enforcement helicopters.

There are no night operations. Flying hours begin at morning civil twilight and end at evening civil twilight. Fuel is self-serve.

Among other fixed-wing aircraft, vintage planes can be seen on Sonoma Valley's apron, such as a fully restored, flying Curtiss P-40, a North American SNJ-4, three Boeing-Stearman PT-17 biplanes, a Globe Swift, a Cessna 195, a Douglas DC-3, a Dornier Do 27 or a Seabee amphibious. Others are being restored, like a Howard DGA-15.

On the airfield are the Vintage Aircraft Company, air tour operator, and the North Bay Air Museum, a flying museum. Vintage Aircraft offers flights in restored WWII open cockpit Stearmans and AT6 Texan.

See also
 List of airports in the San Francisco Bay area
 Other airfields in Sonoma County:
 Sonoma Skypark (0Q9) ( S)
 Petaluma Municipal Airport (O69) ( E)
 Sonoma County Airport (KSTS) ( SE)
 Healdsburg Municipal Airport (KHES) ( SE)

References

External links
 

Airports in Sonoma County, California
Buildings and structures in Sonoma, California
Sonoma Valley